Hans Peter Hansen (20 December 1829 – 18 November 1899) was a Danish xylographer who specialized in portraits.

Hansen was born in Copenhagen. He first learned the profession of watchmaking before studying woodcutting under Hans Christian Henneberg, Johann Adolf Kittendorff, and Johan Peter Aagaard. At the same time, he also followed courses at the Academy of Arts of Copenhagen (1843/44).

In 1854, he travelled to Germany, first to Dresden and then to Leipzig, where he settled. In 1859, he married Clara Aurelia Sophie Langer (5 August 1830 – 1 July 1913), the daughter of the engraver Georg Gottfried Langer and sister of engraver Karl Hermann Theodor Langer (17 December 1819 – 1895).

In 1864, he returned to Copenhagen, where he worked for several illustrated magazines and newspapers, such as Illustreret Tidende and Ude og Hjemme. He also illustrated books, amongst them Nyere Dansk Malerkunst (Sigurd Müller, 1884) and the children books printed by Richardt's and Rode's.

References 

 Nyrop, Camillus: Hansen, Hans Peter, entry in C. F. Bricka (ed.): Dansk biografisk lexikon: tillige omfattende Norge for Tidsrummet 1537–1814; Gyldendal, Copenhagen 1887–1905; vol. VI (1892), p. 633. URL last accessed 2007-09-12. The original version of this article was translated from this entry by Camillus Nyrop (1843 - 1918) in this Danish public domain encyclopedia.
 Kunst Indeks Danmark: Hans Peter Hansen. URL last accessed 2007-09-16.
Thieme-Becker, entry "Hansen, Hans Peter".

1829 births
1899 deaths
19th-century Danish engravers
19th-century Danish illustrators